Vaala Airfield is an airfield in Vaala, Finland, about  south-southwest from Vaala municipal centre.

See also 
 List of airports in Finland

References

External links
 VFR Suomi/Finland – Vaala Airfield
 Lentopaikat.net – Vaala Airfield 

Airports in Finland
Airfield
Buildings and structures in North Ostrobothnia